Villa Bella is a village in the Vaca Díez Province, in the Beni Department of Bolivia.

References 

Populated places in Beni Department